Guido Rudin (born 13 January 1963) was a Swiss footballer who played in the 1980s. He played mainly as defender, but also as midfielder.

Rudin played his youth football with FC Basel and joined their first team in their 1982–83 season under head coach Rainer Ohlhauser. In that season he played in just one test match as Basel won against Old Boys 2–0 on the Schützenmatte. After another three test matches, Rudin played his domestic league debut for the club in the away game in the Stade Tourbillon in Sion, on 13 November 1982 as Basel were defeated 3–5 by FC Sion.

Between the years 1982 and 1985 Rudin played a total of 36 games for Basel scoring just one goal. 11 of these games were in the Nationalliga A, one was in the Swiss Cup and 24 were friendly games. He scored his only goal in the test game on 30 January 1985 as Basel won 1–0 against German team 1. FC Herzogenaurach during a trainings camp in Lanzarote.

References

Sources
 Die ersten 125 Jahre. Publisher: Josef Zindel im Friedrich Reinhardt Verlag, Basel. 
 Verein "Basler Fussballarchiv" Homepage

FC Basel players
Swiss men's footballers
Association football defenders
Association football midfielders
1963 births
Living people